The New Jersey ShoreCats was a professional basketball team in the United States Basketball League (USBL) from 1998 to 2000. The team was based in Asbury Park, New Jersey and played home games at Asbury Park Convention Hall. 

The ShoreCats were owned by a group called New Jersey Hoop Group which was composed of three investors; George Michals, Tony Caruso and Jim Jennings. Jennings also served as team president in 1998. Rick Barry was hired as the Shorecats head coach before the 1998 season. Dwight D. Wilbur served as Barry's assistant coach. New Jersey's first pick in the 1998 USBL draft was Elijah Allen from Farleigh Dickenson University. By May 31, 1998 the team was averaging a paid attendance of 1,900 per game and had $500,000 in corporate sponsorships according to team president and part-owner Jim Jennings. Yinka Dare, the 7'1" center who previously played for the NBA New Jersey Nets, played for the ShoreCats in 1998 and averaged 14.2 points, 9.9 rebounds and 3.6 blocks per game. He was released by the team in June 1998 due to "personal matters" according to New Jersey coach Rick Barry. By the end of the season, the ShoreCats were averaging more than 2,000 attendees per game — a USBL best. Greg Grant was hired as head coach for the 2000 season. He replaced Rick Barry who served as the team's head coach for two seasons (1998–99). Grant suspended New Jersey's assistant coach Marshall Grier on May 8, 2000. Grant later resigned due to disagreements with Grier, who was given the interim head coaching reigns.

All-time roster

Elijah Allen 
Tunji Awojobi
Mark Blount
Ira Bowman 
Yinka Dare 
A. J. English
Darrin Hancock
Freddy Herzog
Matt Garrison
Kwan Johnson
Jabaar Jones
John  Kimbrell
Tony Madison
Marshall Grier
Jason Murdock 
Rocky Walls
Speedy Williams

Season-by-season records

See also
New Jersey Gems
New Jersey Jammers
New Jersey Meteors

References

External links
New Jersey ShoreCats at USbasket.com
New Jersey ShoreCats at OurSportsCentral.com

United States Basketball League teams
1998 establishments in New Jersey
2001 disestablishments in New Jersey
Basketball teams in New Jersey